A Violent Emotion is the second album released by American electronic-industrial band Aesthetic Perfection.  It was released on September 26, 2008 by Bractune Records. It was re-released on the label Deathwatch Asia in 2010 with a limited edition disc of remixes. A music video was released for the track .

Track listing

References

2008 albums